Saraswati Bhattarai (born 8 March 1994) is a Nepalese middle-distance runner. She competed at the 2016 Summer Olympics in Rio de Janeiro, in the women's 1500 metres. She was the flag bearer for Nepal in the closing ceremony.

References

External links

1994 births
Living people
Nepalese female middle-distance runners
Olympic athletes of Nepal
Athletes (track and field) at the 2016 Summer Olympics
Athletes (track and field) at the 2018 Asian Games
Asian Games competitors for Nepal
21st-century Nepalese women